Raja Rani Raji is a 2018 Indian Bengali-language romanctic-comedy film, starring Bonny Sengupta and Rittika Sen directed by Rajiv Kumar Biswas. The movie released on 23 May 2018 produced by Shrikant Mohta under the banner of Shree Venkatesh Films. It is the remake of the Tamil film Boss Engira Bhaskaran (2010).

Plot
Raja (Bonny Sengupta) is a good-for-nothing fellow who repeatedly fails at the college examination and spends his days idling with his friend Gobinda (Parthasarathi Chakraborty). Gobinda has a saloon named Powerpaglu Saloon. While going for final examination a third time, Raja suddenly comes across his classmate Isha (Rittika Sen) and almost falls in love with her at first sight. But Raja does not have any idea about the English language and fails to understand the meaning of the word ‘pardon’ that Isha always says after Raja's every proposal.
Raja's attempts at wooing Isha, under Gobinda's guidance, are not even unintentionally hilarious. Isha is getting just irritated.

The studious Isha, who initially loathes Raja, suddenly starts finding him interesting when her elder sister marries Raja's elder brother who is an animal-doctor. Raja goes through his first reality check when he asks for Isha's hand in marriage from her elder sister, who is now his sister-in-law. She tells him that no one, not even Raja himself, would like to get his or her sister married to a fellow like him, who has no aspiration in life nor any source of income. Then Raja aimed to earn income in life. He challenged his family that in six months he will get a job and will earn money for himself.

Despite knowing that Raja is incompetent, she asks for his forgiveness for prompting him to leave home in a fit of anger and sets out to help him by arranging a loan for some unknown purpose from the bank her father works in. Later, when she is almost convinced of Raja's worthlessness, she suddenly asks him to marry her and promises to take over his responsibilities.
Raja starts a tuition centre. His all appointed teachers fled seeing the naughtiness of the failed Madhyamik students. Then he admitted a blind madam who is M.A passed science teacher, whom he met while buying a free mobile for Isha. By his teaching all students passed exams with good qualification and the coaching centre starts to run with good fame.
But, as Gobinda insulted Isha's father at a conference for not giving Raja a loan, he chose another abroad boy Aditya (Yash Dasgupta) for Isha's marriage. But as the boy has another relation to another girl, he confesses Isha's father for doing Isha's marriage with Raja. And the marriage of Isha and Raja takes place.

Cast
 Bonny Sengupta as Raja
 Rittika Sen as Isha
 Parthasarathi Chakrabarty as Gobinda
 Supriyo Dutta
 Biswajit Chakraborty as Isha's father
 Yash Dasgupta in a cameo appearance as Aditya (ending climax)
 Simron Upadhyay as Raja's Sister

Crew

Release
The official trailer of the movie released on 8 March 2018 and the film released on 23 March 2018.

Soundtrack

The official soundtrack for Raja Rani Raji composed by Dev Sen, Aditya Sengupta and Lincon released on 24 February 2018.

References

2018 films
Bengali remakes of Tamil films
Indian romantic comedy films
Films directed by Rajiv Kumar Biswas
Bengali-language Indian films
2010s Bengali-language films
2018 romantic comedy films